The HTC Desire 620 is an Android-based smartphone designed and manufactured by HTC. It is part of the Desire range of mid-range handsets. It was announced on 29 November 2014 in Taiwan. It was announced for the European market on 9 December 2014.

Specifications

Design 
The HTC Desire 620 has a 5 inch display with sizable bezels; there is a front-facing camera, a speaker grill and sensors at the upper bezel of the display while there is an "HTC" logo and a speaker grill at the lower bezel of the display. On the side frame; there is a volume rocker and a power button at the right side, there is a 3.5 mm headphone jack at the top and there is a microUSB port and a microphone hole at the bottom; the left side is empty. The rear-facing camera is located at the back with the LED flash right under it. It has a removable back cover with an "HTC" logo; removing the back cover reveals a removable battery, a microSD card slot and a SIM card slot.

The phone measures 150.1 x 72.7 x 9.6 mm and weighs 160 grams. It is available in white, gray, gray with orange accents, gray with blue accents and white with orange accents.

Hardware 
The HTC Desire 620 is powered by Qualcomm Snapdragon 410 system-on-chip with a 1.2 GHz quad-core ARM Cortex-A53 64-bit CPU and Adreno 306 GPU. It comes with 1 GB RAM and 8 GB internal storage expandable up to 128 GB through the microSD card slot.

The phone has a 5-inch LCD display with 720x1280 pixels resolution and 294 ppi pixel density. It has dual front-facing speakers.

The phone comes with an 8 megapixel back-mounted BSI camera with 1080p video recording. There is also a 5 megapixel front-mounted BSI camera with 1080p video recording.

The device has a 2100mAh removable lithium polymer battery.

The phone has Wi-Fi 802.11 b/g/n, Bluetooth 4.0, microUSB and GPS. It also supports LTE connectivity.

Software 
The HTC Desire 620 runs on Android 4.4 KitKat with HTC's Sense UI 6 out of the box.

Variants

There are 2 versions of the HTC Desire 620: Desire 620 with single SIM support and Desire 620G with dual SIM support.  Although these two models have similar specifications, there are some differences; Desire 620G uses MediaTek MT6592 system-on-chip with a 1.7 GHz octa-core ARM Cortex-A7 32-bit CPU and ARM Mali-450 MP4 GPU instead of the Qualcomm Snapdragon 410 system-on-chip, lacks LTE (4G) connectivity and has microSD card support up to 32 GB instead of 128 GB.

References

See also
 Comparison of HTC devices

Android (operating system) devices
Desire 620
Mobile phones introduced in 2014
Discontinued smartphones
Mobile phones with user-replaceable battery